Kevin Utterson (born 17 July 1976) is a Scottish rugby union player who won 3 caps at centre for Scotland in 2003.

Early life
Utterson was born on 17 July 1976 in Edinburgh, Scotland. He played for the South of Scotland under-18 team.

Early club career
In 2001 he played for Kelso RFC in the Melrose sevens. In May 2002 he signed for the Border Reivers. He captained the team.

International career
While playing for Edinburgh Reivers, he made his Scotland A debut in November 2000. He was called into the full senior squad the following month.

After consistent performances for the Borders he was named in the full senior squad for the start of the 2003 Six Nations Championship He made his first international appearance at age 26, on 22 February 2003 against France. His third appearance for Scotland was his last, coming on as a replacement against England at Twickenham on 22 March 2003.

Later rugby
He was released by Borders in September 2004. He played his final game for Kelso in March 2012.

References

External links 
 profile on ESPN

1976 births
Living people
Scottish rugby union players
Rugby union centres
Scotland international rugby union players
Edinburgh Rugby players
Border Reivers players
Kelso RFC players
Rugby union players from Edinburgh